Eric Vale (born Christopher Eric Johnson) is an American voice actor who provided voices for a number of English versions of Japanese anime series. He is known for voicing Koichiro Iketani in the Initial D series, Trunks in the Dragon Ball series, Sanji in One Piece, Kogoro Akechi in Trickster, Keisuke Umehara in Big Windup!, Huey Laforet in Baccano!, Tobari Durandal Kumohira in Nabari no Ou, Jean Croce in Gunslinger Girl series, Kisumi Shigino in Free! series, Kakeru Ryuen in Classroom of the Elite, Solf J. Kimblee in Fullmetal Alchemist, Kazuma in Noragami series, Tsunenaga Tamaki in Deadman Wonderland, Qisha Tianling in Chaos Dragon, Akechi in Rampo Kitan: Game of Laplace, Casshern in Casshern Sins, Hayato Kujo in Aquarion Logos, America and Canada in the Hetalia: Axis Powers series, Ferid Bathory in the Seraph of the End series, Yuki Sohma in Fruits Basket series, Tenko "Tomura Shigaraki" Shimura in My Hero Academia, Loke in Fairy Tail and Phoenix Wright from Ace Attorney.

Filmography

Anime

Films

Video games

References

External links
 
 
 

 Eric Vale at the CrystalAcids Anime Voice Actor Database

Living people
American male screenwriters
American male television writers
American male video game actors
American male voice actors
American television writers
American voice directors
Male actors from Dallas
Screenwriters from Texas
20th-century American male actors
21st-century American male actors
1974 births